Eðvarð Þór Eðvarðsson (born 29 January 1967) is an Icelandic backstroke and medley swimmer. He competed in three events at the 1988 Summer Olympics.

References

External links
 

1967 births
Living people
Edvard Thor Edvardsson
Edvard Thor Edvardsson
Edvard Thor Edvardsson
Swimmers at the 1988 Summer Olympics
Place of birth missing (living people)